Dalaca stigmatica is a species of moth of the family Hepialidae. It is known from Paraguay.

References

External links
Hepialidae genera

Moths described in 1937
Hepialidae
Invertebrates of Paraguay
Moths of South America